Billel Abdelkadous (born 22 May 1990) is a French footballer who plays as a midfielder or winger for Mondorf.

Career
Abdelkadous started his career with French side Amnéville. In 2011, he signed for BX Brussels in Belgium. In 2013, Abdelkadous signed for Algerian club RCA, where he made 22 league appearances and scored 2 goals. On 24 August 2013, he debuted for RCA during a 0–1 loss to CRB. On 3 September 2013, Abdelkadous scored his first goal for RCA during a 2–1 win over USMH.

In 2014, he signed for Vereya in Bulgaria. In 2016, Abdelkadous signed for Jordanian team Shabab Urdun. In 2017, he returned to Amnéville in the French fifth division. In 2018, he signed for French fourth division outfit Épinal. In 2019, Abdelkadous returned to Amnéville in the French fifth division. In 2021, he signed for Luxembourgish side Mondorf.

References

External links
 
 

French footballers
RC Arbaâ players
FC Vereya players
SAS Épinal players
US Mondorf-les-Bains players
French expatriate sportspeople in Belgium
Living people
1990 births
Expatriate footballers in Algeria
Expatriate footballers in Bulgaria
Expatriate footballers in Luxembourg
Expatriate footballers in Belgium
Luxembourg National Division players
Second Professional Football League (Bulgaria) players
Algerian Ligue Professionnelle 1 players
Championnat National 3 players
CSO Amnéville players
BX Brussels players
R.E. Virton players
Championnat National 2 players
Expatriate footballers in Jordan
Association football wingers
Association football midfielders
French expatriate sportspeople in Luxembourg
French expatriate sportspeople in Bulgaria
French expatriate sportspeople in Algeria
French expatriate footballers